The Sunshine Coast Grammar School is a private Christian school located in Forest Glen, a town on Queensland's Sunshine Coast.

The school has a student body of over 1200, from prep to grade 12. The school was established in 1997. It is owned by  Presbyterian and Methodist Schools Association, which operates several other schools in Queensland.

History 

The School was originally started as a non-denominational educational institute, by the founding headmaster John Burgess.

The Presbyterian and Methodist Schools Association purchased the school from Burgess after he was forced to relinquish financial possession of the school. Nigel Fairbairn took over from the Presbyterian and Methodist Schools Association's Dr Evans.

On July 1, 2006 the school officially opened its Early Learning Centre for children 6 weeks old to school age. This added to the size of the school area-wise.

On June 2, 2008, the school flooded after an overnight deluge of rain. The overnight rain came on top of the rain from the prior week. No major incidents were reported, although one car was caught in a creek at the school. The Maxwell Foley Centre for Excellence was built in 2013 and named after the former student's contributions to the Grammar School's community.

Motto 
Sunshine Coast Grammar School's motto is "Where Passion Meets Purpose".

Academia 
Sunshine Coast Grammar School separates its student body into four parts: Early Learning, Junior, Middle and Senior. They cover the traditional school years of kindergarten to preschool, year 1 to year 6, year 7 to year 9 and year 12 In the Senior School, Year 10 students face a difficult curriculum, to prepare them to meet the state-regulated "Senior Education and Training Plan", which leads students to set their direction, i.e., choose a career area.

In 2003, students in year 4 won awards for Creative Writing at the Ekka

OP results 
At the end of 2006, there were nine Overall Position (OP) 1s and seven OP 2s awarded to the Year 12s with 33% of the students getting OP 5 or better. These were the top results of any school on the Sunshine Coast.

Sister schools 

The school has two sister schools, Mulgrave School in Canada and Seijo Gakuen Junior High School and High School in Japan.  Students may participate in student exchange programs with either of these schools.

Houses 
The school has four sporting houses which the students are divided into. They are as follows:

Sport 

Both the first XV rugby team and the first XI cricket team have become state champions, by competing in the Ballymore Cup and Australia Post cricket competition respectively.

See also 
 List of schools in Queensland

References

External links 
 Sunshine Coast Grammar School website
 Study in Queensland profile

Private schools in Queensland
High schools in Queensland
Former Methodist schools in Australia
Uniting Church schools in Australia
Presbyterian schools in Australia
Junior School Heads Association of Australia Member Schools
Schools on the Sunshine Coast, Queensland
Educational institutions established in 1997
1997 establishments in Australia